Percy Richards (1906 – after 1936) was a Welsh professional footballer who played as an outside forward.

References

1906 births
Date of death missing
Footballers from Merthyr Tydfil
Welsh footballers
Cardiff City F.C. players
Chesterfield F.C. players
Tranmere Rovers F.C. players
Newport County A.F.C. players
Merthyr Town F.C. players
Leicester City F.C. players
Coventry City F.C. players
Bath City F.C. players
Brierley Hill Alliance F.C. players
English Football League players
Association football forwards